Anandakrishnan Glacier is a glacier about  long draining through the Ruppert Coast north of Strauss Glacier in Antarctica. It was named by the Advisory Committee on Antarctic Names after Sridhar Anandakrishnan, a Penn State University geophysicist, whose glaciological interests focus on Antarctic ice sheet studies, ice stream migration, time-series investigations, and Antarctic tectonics.

See also
 List of glaciers in the Antarctic
 Glaciology

References 

Glaciers of Marie Byrd Land